Horacio Ramírez Reyes Escobar (born 17 November 1983) is a Mexican politician from the National Action Party. From 2011 to 2012 he served as Deputy of the LXI Legislature of the Mexican Congress representing Hidalgo.

References

1983 births
Living people
Politicians from Hidalgo (state)
National Action Party (Mexico) politicians
21st-century Mexican politicians
Deputies of the LXI Legislature of Mexico
Members of the Chamber of Deputies (Mexico) for Hidalgo (state)